Santurtzi is a station on line 2 of the Bilbao metro. It is also the southern terminus of the Mamariga shuttle. It is located in the municipality of Santurtzi. It opened, together with the neighboring Peñota station, on 4 July 2009.

There is a station on the Cercanías Bilbao commuter railway network with the same name, but the two stations are not connected.

Station layout 

Santurtzi station follows the typical cavern-shaped layout of most underground Metro Bilbao stations designed by Norman Foster, with the main hall located directly above the rail tracks.

Access 

  Vapor Habana St. (Casa Torre Jauregia exit)
  Las Viñas St. (Las Viñas exit, closed during night time services)
  Virgen del Mar Plaza (Mamariga exit)
   Gernika Park (Casa Torre Jauregia exit)
   Virgen del Mar Plaza (Mamariga exit)

Services 
The station is served by line 2 from Kabiezes to Basauri with headways from five to ten minutes. Bus stops near the station are served by Bizkaibus regional services.

References

External links
 

Line 2 (Bilbao metro) stations
Railway stations in Spain opened in 2009
2009 establishments in the Basque Country (autonomous community)